The Thai Ambassador to the Court of St James's in London is the official representative of the Government in Bangkok to the Government of the United Kingdom and concurrently to the Government of Denmark

List of representatives

 Thailand–United Kingdom relations

References 

 
United Kingdom
Thailand